Mountain of Black Glass is a science fiction novel by American writer Tad Williams, the third book in his Otherland series.  It was first published in 1999 with a paperback edition in 2000.

Continuing from River of Blue Fire it brings the characters together at the battle of Troy and finally to the heart of the Grail Brotherhood.

References

1999 American novels
1999 science fiction novels
American science fiction novels
Novels by Tad Williams
Novels set in ancient Troy
DAW Books books
Books with cover art by Michael Whelan